The LAPOP Lab (formerly known as the Latin American Public Opinion Project) is a research institute specializing in the development, implementation, and analysis of public opinion surveys. Founded by Mitchell A. Seligson over two decades ago, its principal focus is on governance and democracy in Latin America. The AmericasBarometer is the best-known survey produced by LAPOP.  It is the most extensive survey of democratic public opinion and behavior that covers the Americas (North, Central, South, and the Caribbean). It measures democratic values and behaviors using voter surveys. Elizabeth Zechmeister is the director of LAPOP. Noam Lupu is associate director of LAPOP.

History 

LAPOP has its origins in studies of democratic values in Costa Rica. This pioneering public opinion research took place in the 1970s, a time in which much of the rest of Latin America was under the control of authoritarian regimes, prohibiting studies of public opinion.   As democratization expanded in Latin America, LAPOP grew in scope and size. Today LAPOP regularly carries out public opinion surveys in nearly every country in Latin America, Canada, the United States, and much of the Caribbean.

Structure 

LAPOP is housed at Vanderbilt University in Nashville, Tennessee. Vanderbilt is a research university that has been a leader in the study of Latin America and the Caribbean for over 60 years. At this host institution, a team of faculty, staff, post-doctoral researchers, graduate students, and undergraduate students designs and analyzes the public opinion surveys generated by the project. The group also edits and publishes the regular Insights Series reports, each one of which examines one facet of public opinion. LAPOP’s network extends far beyond the Vanderbilt campus, to include partner institutions throughout the Americas.

LAPOP functions as a consortium, working in partnership with numerous academic and non-governmental institutions in Latin America and the Caribbean. It collaborates with these institutions, sharing ideas for survey content and working together to disseminate the results of the public opinion surveys to the citizens of participating countries. This dissemination of results takes the form of systematic country reports, comparative studies, panel presentations, and media interviews.

AmericasBarometer 

In 2004, LAPOP established the AmericasBarometer.

Methods and practices 

Cutting-edge methods and transparent practices ensure that data collected by LAPOP are of the highest quality.   These methods and practices include the following:

Pre-survey 
 Solicitation of input from a vast network of academics, practitioners, and policymakers
 Use of Vanderbilt University’s experimental research lab to test new items
 Extensive in-country pre-testing of survey items
 Translation of surveys into more than 15 languages spoken in the Americas
 Expert design of national probability samples
 Approval from Vanderbilt University’s Institutional Review Board for the protection of human subjects

Implementation 
 Rigorous training of all interviewers using guidelines published in extensive training manuals
 Partnerships with reputable survey organizations in the regions
 Widespread use of electronic handheld devices (PDAs and smartphones) and software designed by LAPOP to allow multilingual interviews and extensive validity checks

Post-survey 
 Use of cutting-edge statistical programs and methods
 Presentation of results in clear, user-friendly graphs
 Public dissemination of results in surveyed design and methods on the LAPOP website
 Immediate uploading of data into LAPOP’s free interactive data analysis program

LAPOP’s resources and expertise allow it to conduct special projects requested by scholars, government institutions, and agencies concerned with democratic development. These have recently included novel experiments embedded within national surveys to assess issues of ethnicity and violence. In addition, these include an extensive new focus on randomized block experiments as a means of program evaluation.

References

External links
 LAPOP Homepage
 AmericasBarometer Insights Series

Latin America
Political research institutes
Political science
Public opinion